Vangi Bath (Kannada: ವಾಂಗಿ ಬಾತ್) is a vegetarian South Indian dish that originated in Karnataka, Mysore region, though it is found throughout India. Vangi means brinjal (eggplant) and bhath means rice. Mostly viewed as a dry dish, it is accompanied with Mosaru Bajji or Raita. The flavor is that of coconut and coriander blended well with some mild spices. Traditionally, the dish is prepared using younger, green brinjal, though any variety of brinjal can be used in the creation of the dish, though the final result may differ between the varieties, and some opt out of using brinjal at all.

Types of eggplants 
Any of the Brinjal variety would work fine with this dish but the taste will differ. Usually Fairytale or Barbarella are used. Fairy Tale is a thinner variety eggplant with strips and has buttery texture and taste, so it cooks very fast. It has very less seeds so it works very well in this dish.

Substitutions of eggplants 
It is possible to prepare this dish in the same way with just Capsicum. It also works well with Potato or Ivy Gourd.

Tradition and culture 
Vangi Bhath, a dish also prepared specially during festival or family get togethers, feast etc. Normally a good quantity of vangi bhath masala is made in advance and stored at least for about 2 weeks and used again or use it with other vegetables too.

Ingredients 
Main Ingredients: Eggplant, Rice

Recipe 

8-10 baby eggplants, cut into 4 with stems intact

1.5 cups rice – cooked

2 teaspoons + 2 tablespoons oil

2 medium onions sliced

chopped fresh coriander for garnishing

6-7 dried red chillies

1 tablespoon split Bengal gram (chana dal, soaked and drained)

scraped coconut for garnishing

8-10 curry leaves

2-3 green chillies, split

2 teaspoons tamarind pulp

1 teaspoon mustard seeds

0.5 teaspoon turmeric powder

8-10 black peppercorns

2-3 cloves

1 teaspoon fennel seeds

2 teaspoons poppy seeds

2-3 green cardamoms

pinch of asafoetida

salt

Side notes 
The Dish has been used in August 2017 by the Chief Minister Siddaramaiah to counter those who are opposed to pro-poor policies.

He said: “For the past three years, it’s only Mr. Modi’s Mann ki Baat that’s going on. But we are only concerned about vangibath for the poor.”

References 

Indian rice dishes
South Indian cuisine
Karnataka cuisine